Wilhelm Antoni Góra (18 January 1916 – 21 May 1975) was a Polish midfield soccer player.

His career started in Szarlej (Scharley O/S) - a small hamlet located near Bytom -Beuthen O/S. After some years, he moved to Pogon Katowice (which no longer exists) and then changed to Cracovia - one of the best teams of interwar Poland.

His debut in the Polish Soccer League took place in 1934, and until 1939 Gora participated in 134 Cracovia's games, winning the 1937 Championship of Poland title. In 1935 he debuted in the Polish National Team and in 1936 was a participant in Berlin, Germany Olympic Games, where Poland was placed on the 4th location. Also, he took part in the legendary 1938 FIFA World Cup game Poland - Brazil 5-6 (the match took place on 5 June 1938 in Strasbourg, France).

Until 1939 Góra was a key midfield player of the Polish National Team and by then he had played in 16 games. After the beginning of World War II, he signed the Volksliste (German nationality list), which allowed him to continue the career. Gora remained in Kraków, playing in a German-only team DTSG Krakau (one of the sponsors of this club was Oskar Schindler). Called up to the Wehrmacht, he was taken with his unit to Italy, where he was captured by Allied soldiers. There, Góra joined the 2nd Corps of the Polish army under General Władysław Anders.

After 1945, Góra wanted to return to Upper Silesia. However, this proved to be impossible and thus he remained in West Germany, where he died.

References

See also
 Polish Roster in World Cup Soccer France 1938

1916 births
1975 deaths
Sportspeople from Bytom
Polish footballers
Poland international footballers
MKS Cracovia (football) players
Olympic footballers of Poland
Footballers at the 1936 Summer Olympics
1938 FIFA World Cup players
German prisoners of war in World War II
Polish military personnel of World War II
People from the Province of Silesia
Association football midfielders
German Army personnel of World War II
Polish emigrants to Germany
Volksdeutsche